Nanna loloana is a moth of the  subfamily Arctiinae. It was described by Strand in 1912. It is found in Cameroon.

References

 Natural History Museum Lepidoptera generic names catalog

Endemic fauna of Cameroon
Lithosiini
Moths described in 1912